John Flynn (February 14, 1932 – April 4, 2007) was an American  film director and screenwriter known for films such as The Outfit and Rolling Thunder.

Biography
Flynn was born in Chicago and raised in Hermosa Beach, California. He served in the Coast Guard, and studied journalism with Roots author Alex Haley. Flynn received a degree in journalism from UCLA.

Assistant
Flynn entered the film industry when Robert Wise hired him to do some research for a biopic of Robert Capa. The film never was made, but he got along with Wise who hired Flynn to work as his assistant on Odds Against Tomorrow.

Flynn subsequently worked as the script supervisor on West Side Story and as a second assistant director on  Kid Galahad and Two for the Seesaw. He then worked as first assistant director on The Great Escape and second unit director on Kings of the Sun ("a bullshit script, a popcorn script," according to Flynn). This was directed by J. Lee Thompson who used Flynn again as an assistant director on What a Way to Go! and John Goldfarb, Please Come Home!.

Film director
In 1966, Wise set up a company to produce low-budget films that others would direct. He optioned Dennis Murphy's novel The Sergeant and hired Flynn to direct. The movie starred Rod Steiger.

His next movie, The Jerusalem File was shot in Israel. It did not perform particularly well at the box office but The Outfit did. This was an adaptation of the novel by Donald Westlake starring Robert Duvall.

The filmmaker achieved a dedicated cult following with the gritty revenge thriller Rolling Thunder starring William Devane and Tommy Lee Jones. The film was highly controversial because of its violence. In a 1994 interview with Jon Stewart, filmmaker Quentin Tarantino cited Rolling Thunder as an influence and Flynn among his favorite directors. The film received praise for its action sequences, atmosphere, direction, music and cast performances; however, it was criticized for its pace and violent climax. In addition to its critical success, the film was also a box-office success with an estimated revenue of $130 million against its $5 million production budget.

He made a number of higher-profile films in the late 1980s, including the James Woods neo-noir Best Seller, the Sylvester Stallone prison drama Lock Up, and the Steven Seagal action film Out for Justice.

In the early 1990s, Flynn directed two made-for-cable-TV films: the Dennis Hopper cop film Nails and the crime drama Scam.

In 1994, he directed Brainscan, a horror film about the dangers of virtual reality, starring Edward Furlong and Frank Langella.

Flynn's last film was the direct-to-video film Protection. He spent the last few years of his life mostly in France.

Flynn died in his sleep at his Los Angeles home. He is survived by his son Tara.

Filmography

Unfilmed projects
On the Day of His Death, from a short novel by Polish writer Marek Hłasko about immigrants in Israel - Flynn had wanted to make it since the 1960s
a police procedural drama set in Paris "in the spirit of Le Samouraï

References

External links
 
 
 Ain't-It-Cool-News tribute
 Vancouver Voice profile
 Foco - Revista de Cinema, special edition devoted to John Flynn

1932 births
2007 deaths
American film directors
University of California, Los Angeles alumni
Writers from Chicago
Action film directors